Round Prairie Township may refer to the following townships in the United States:
 Round Prairie Township, Jefferson County, Iowa
 Round Prairie Township, Todd County, Minnesota
 Round Prairie Township, Callaway County, Missouri